Pedro Lucas may refer to:

 Pedro Lucas (footballer, born 1998), full name Pedro Lucas Schwaizer, Brazilian football forward
 Pedro Lucas (footballer, born 2002), full name Pedro Lucas Tápias Obermüller, Brazilian football attacking midfielder
 Pedro Lucas (rugby union), Portuguese rugby union player